Nakul Chandra Bhuyan (1895–1968) was an Indian historian, playwright, essayist and a short story writer of Assamese language.

Life and career 
The only son of Gopal Chandra Bhuyan and Dalimi Bhuyan, Nakul Chandra Bhuyan was born in 1895 in Charing, Sibsagar District of Assam .

Educated at Jorhat Government Boys' School, Bhuyan passed his matriculation in 1916 and went on to pursue further studies in Calcutta. He returned from Calcutta in 1921 and began working as a Librarian in Dibrugarh, Assam. Later, he joined as an assistant in the Chief Engineering Department of Dibru-Sadiya Railways and thereafter as an assistant in the Deputy Commissioner's office.

In 1923 he got transferred to Tezpur and around the same time  married Kumudeshwari Bhuyan. While at Tezpur he came into contact with various theatre personalities working with the Baan theatre, which inspired him to start writing for the stage. Bhuyan was the president of the Asam Sahitya Sabha in 1967 held at Dibrugarh district, Assam. He also compiled and edited the first authentic edition of Bihu songs, titled "Bohagi" in 1923. Padmadhar Chaliha, the poet-composer of some memorable lyrics inspired by the freedom movement wrote around 1921 an introduction and called the Bihu songs pastoral poetry. The Times of Assam in its adulatory review (19 May 1923) went a step further, describing the poetry as comparable to the best of pastoral poetry of the European tradition.

In 1924, Bhuyan gave up government job and joined Cinamara Tea Estate as Assistant Manager. His sincerity, dedication, and hard work led him to the honorable position of  Senior Manager of Jorehaut Tea Company. In 1954, he retired from Borsapori Tea Estate as Senior Manager.

In his memory a main Thoroughfare in the heart of Jorhat town has been named as "Xahitik Nakul Chandra Bhuyan Path".

Literary works
Some of his literary works are:
 Axom Buranjir Ek Adhyai - Baro Bhuyan
 Baro Bhuyanar Somu Buranji
 Suransuar Sora
 Golpar Xorai
 Xahu Aai
 Badan Barphukan
 Chandrakanta Singha
 Bidruhi Moran
 Bohagi
 Numali Kunwari
 Cha Bagisar Banua
 Xunhotor Bhishma
 Gadapanir Sesh Sidhanta (1923)
 Rādhākānta Sandikai ḍāṅarīẏā

See also
 Assamese literature
 List of Asam Sahitya Sabha presidents
 List of Assamese writers with their pen names

References

External links
 Men, a story by Nakul Chandra Bhuyan, translated by Khanindra Pathak and Jugal Kalita at assam.org.

20th-century Indian dramatists and playwrights
1895 births
1968 deaths
Writers from Assam
Asom Sahitya Sabha Presidents
People from Sivasagar district
20th-century Indian historians
20th-century Indian essayists
20th-century Indian short story writers
20th-century Indian male writers